Bag is a settlement in Bužim, in Bosnia and Herzegovina.

Demographics 
According to the 2013 census, its population was 571.

References

External links
http://www.holiday-weather.com/bag_ba

Populated places in Bužim